Lynette Love (born September 21, 1957) is a former United States Olympian in taekwondo. She achieved a gold medal in the 1988 Seoul Olympics and a bronze medal in the 1992 Barcelona Olympics.  She trained was trained by Dong Ja Yang Howard University.
Nominated for the Sullivan Award in 1988
In the World Guinness Book of Records in 1993 for only American to win 9 national titles and 2 world titles

References

External links

1957 births
Living people
American female taekwondo practitioners
Olympic gold medalists for the United States in taekwondo
Medalists at the 1988 Summer Olympics
Taekwondo practitioners at the 1988 Summer Olympics
Medalists at the 1992 Summer Olympics
Olympic bronze medalists for the United States in taekwondo
World Taekwondo Championships medalists
21st-century American women